Curtly Ambrose, a former West Indian cricketer, took 26 five-wicket hauls at international level. In cricket, a five-wicket haul (also known as a "five–for" or "fifer") refers to a bowler taking five or more wickets in a single innings. This is regarded as a notable achievement, and only 41 bowlers have taken 15 or more five-wicket hauls at international level in their cricketing careers. Ambrose played 98 Tests and 176 One Day Internationals (ODIs), and took 405 and 225 wickets respectively. A right-arm fast bowler who represented the West Indies from 1988 to 2000, he took 22 five-wicket hauls in Tests and 4 in ODIs. The cricket almanack Wisden noted his "smooth, leggy run-up, fast arm action and accuracy", apart from "lethal yorker[s]" and "nasty bouncer[s]", and named him one of their Cricketers of the Year in 1992. Upon his induction into the International Cricket Council Cricket Hall of Fame in September 2011, ESPNcricinfo described Ambrose as "one of the finest bowlers of all time", and as of 2013 he is tenth overall among all-time combined five-wicket haul takers.

Ambrose made his Test debut in 1988 against Pakistan at the Bourda, Georgetown, a match the West Indies lost by 9 wickets. His first five-wicket haul came eight months later against Australia at the WACA Ground, Perth; West Indies won the match by 169 runs. His career-best bowling figures for an innings were 8 wickets for 45 runs  against England at the Kensington Oval, Bridgetown, in April 1990 where his match-winning performance earned him a man of the match award. Ambrose took his solitary pair of five-wicket hauls in a Test match—5 wickets for 60 runs and 6 wickets for 24 runs—against the same opponents at the Queen's Park Oval, Port of Spain, in March 1994, his best bowling performance in a Test match. Ambrose achieved his 22 five-wicket hauls at 12 different grounds, including 11 at 9 different venues outside the West Indies. He was most successful against Australia and England taking eight five-wicket hauls each. He took ten or more wickets in a match on three occasions.

Ambrose made his ODI debut against Pakistan at the Sabina Park, Kingston, in March 1988. His first five-wicket haul in this format came later that year against Australia at the Melbourne Cricket Ground, where he took 5 wickets for 17 runs in the match, his best performance in ODI matches. Ambrose took three of his four one-day five-wicket hauls against Australia and one against Pakistan. As of 2013, he is joint tenth—with Dale Steyn—overall among all-time combined five-wicket haul takers.

Key

Tests

One Day Internationals

Notes

References

External links
 
 

West Indian cricket lists
Ambrose, Curtly